Presented below is an alphabetical index of articles related to Cornwall:

0-9 

 2005 United Kingdom general election result in Cornwall

A 

 A.F.C. St Austell
 A30 road
 A374 road
 A38 road
 A39 road
 Act of Uniformity 1549
 Agan Tavas
 Aire Point to Carrick Du SSSI
 Al Hodge (rock musician)
 Allantide
 Andrew George (politician)
 Anglo-Celtic
 Anglo-Cornish
 Aphex Twin
 Archdeacon of Cornwall
 Atlantic Coast Line, Cornwall
 Atlantic Ocean

B 

 Bal maiden
 Ballowall Barrow
 Baragwanath
 Battle of Deorham
 Battle of Lostwithiel
 Battle of Sampford Courtenay
 Beast of Bodmin
 Bernard Deacon
 Birds of Cornwall
 Bishop Rock
 Bishop of Cornwall
 Bishop of Truro
 Bodmin
 Bodmin & Wenford Railway
 Bodmin (UK Parliament constituency)
 Bodmin Airfield
 Bodmin Gaol
 Bodmin Hospital
 Bodmin Moor
 Bodmin Parish Church
 Bodmin and Wadebridge Railway
 Bolventor
 Boscastle flood of 2004
 Bossiney (UK Parliament constituency)
 Botallack Mine
 Brenda Wootton
 British International Helicopters
 British Isles
 Britpop
 Bro Goth Agan Tasow
 Brown Willy
 Brown Willy effect
 Bude
 Bude Canal

C 

 CSM Association
 Callington (UK Parliament constituency)
 Callington, Cornwall
 Calstock
 Camborne
 Camborne RFC
 Camborne Redruth Community Hospital
 Camborne School of Mines
 Camborne and Redruth (UK Parliament constituency)
 Camborne-Redruth
 Camelford
 Camelford (UK Parliament constituency)
 Caradon
 Caradon local elections
 Carbis Bay
 Carn Brea, Redruth
 Carn Euny
 Carn Marth
 Carrick Roads
 Carrick local elections
 Carrick, Cornwall
 Castle An Dinas
 Castle Dore
 Celtic Christianity
 Celtic Congress
 Celtic League (political organisation)
 Celtic Sea
 Celtic music
 Celtic nations
 Celts
 Ceremonial counties of England
 Chacewater
 Chewidden Thursday
 Christianity in Cornwall
 Chysauster Ancient Village
 Chûn Castle
 Chûn Quoit
 Climate of England
 Clio (barque)
 Clotted cream
 Clyst Heath
 Clyst St Mary
 Colin Breed
 Combined Universities in Cornwall
 Commando Ridge
 Constitutional status of Cornwall
 Cornish Assembly
 Cornish Foreshore Case
 Cornish Gilliflower
 Cornish Language Council
 Cornish Main Line
 Cornish Mines & Engines
 Cornish Nationalist Party
 Cornish Pirates
 Cornish Rebellion of 1497
 Cornish Riviera Express
 Cornish Seal Sanctuary
 Cornish Solidarity
 Cornish Yarg
 Cornish and Breton twin towns
 Cornish bagpipes
 Cornish currency
 Cornish dance
 Cornish diaspora
 Cornish emigration
 Cornish fairings
 Cornish game hen
 Cornish heath
 Cornish hurling
 Cornish language
 Cornish mythology
 Cornish nationalism
 Cornish people
 Cornish pilot gig
 Cornish rotten and pocket boroughs
 Cornish stamps
 Cornish surnames
 Cornish symbols
 Cornish tartans
 Cornish wrestling
 Cornovii (Cornish)
 Cornwall
 Cornwall (UK Parliament constituency)
 Cornwall (territorial duchy)
 Cornwall 2000
 Cornwall Air Ambulance
 Cornwall College
 Cornwall Combination
 Cornwall Council
 2009 Cornwall Council election
 Cornwall County Cricket Club
 Cornwall Minerals Railway
 Cornwall Railway
 Cornwall Railway viaducts
 Cornwall Record Office
 Cornwall Wildlife Trust
 Cornwall and Plymouth (European Parliament constituency)
 Cornwall and West Devon Mining Landscape
 Cornwall and West Plymouth (European Parliament constituency)
 Cornwall in the English Civil War
 Cornwall local elections
 Cotehele
 County
 Crackington Haven
 Crown Mines
 Cuisine of Cornwall
 Culture of Cornwall
 Custos Rotulorum of Cornwall
 Cyder

D 

 Dalleth
 Dan Rogerson
 Demographics of Cornwall
 Devon
 Devon and Cornwall Constabulary
 Devon and Cornwall Rail Partnership
 Diocese of Exeter
 Diocese of Truro
 Disused railway stations (Bodmin to Wadebridge line)
 Disused railway stations (Plymouth to Penzance Line)
 Doc Martin
 Dolcoath mine
 Downderry
 Dozmary Pool
 Drift Reservoir
 Duchess of Cornwall
 Duchies in the United Kingdom
 Duchy of Cornwall
 Dudley Savage
 Duke of Cornwall
 Dumnonia
 Dumnonii
 Dupath Well

E 

 E. G. Retallack Hooper
 Earl of Cornwall
 Early Cornish Texts
 East Cornwall (UK Parliament constituency)
 East Looe (UK Parliament constituency)
East Wheal Rose railway station
 Economy of Cornwall
 Eddystone Lighthouse
 Eden Project
 Emmet (Cornish)
 Endonym
 England
 English Channel
 English Heritage Archive
 Eurasia
 Europe

F 

 Falmouth Docks Police
 Falmouth Lifeboat Station
 Falmouth Quay Punt
 Falmouth RFC
 Falmouth Town A.F.C.
 Falmouth University
 Falmouth and Camborne (UK Parliament constituency)
 Falmouth, Cornwall
 Federation of Old Cornwall Societies
 First South West
 Fishing in Cornwall
 Fistral Beach
 Flora and fauna of Cornwall
 Fowey
 Fowey (UK Parliament constituency)
 Fowey Gallants
 Framework Convention for the Protection of National Minorities
 Frederick Hamilton Davey
 Frederick Stanley Jackson
 Frenchman's Creek (novel)
 Furry Dance

G 

 GCHQ CSO Morwenstow
 GWR 3700 Class 3440 City of Truro
 Geevor Tin Mine
 Geography of Cornwall
 Geology of Cornwall
 Geology of Lizard, Cornwall
 Glasney College
 Glendurgan Garden
 Godrevy
 Godrevy Island
 Golowan
 Goonhilly Downs
 Gorseth Kernow
 Goss Moor NNR
 Gover Stream
 Grade I listed buildings in Cornwall
 Grade II* listed buildings in Cornwall
 Grade II* listed buildings in Cornwall (A–G)
 Grade II* listed buildings in Cornwall (H–P)
 Grade II* listed buildings in Cornwall (Q–Z)
 Grampound (UK Parliament constituency)
 Great Britain
 Great Cornish Families
 Guise dancing
 Guldize
 Gwithian

H 

 
 HMS Raleigh (shore establishment)
 
 Halliggye Fogou
 Hamoaze
 Harlyn
 Hayle
 Healthcare in England
 Heavy cake
 Helford
 Helford Passage
 Helford River
 Helston
 Helston (UK Parliament constituency)
 Helston RFC
 Helston Railway Preservation Company
 Henry Jenner
 High Sheriff of Cornwall
 History of Cornwall
 Hog's pudding
 Hundreds of Cornwall

I 

 Institute of Cornish Studies
 Isles of Scilly
 Isles of Scilly Skybus

J 

 Jacobite uprising in Cornwall of 1715
 Jamaica Inn
 Jamaica Inn (film)
 Jamaica Inn (novel)
 John Boson (writer)
 Julia Goldsworthy

K 

 Ken George
 Kernewek Kemmyn
 Kernewek Lowender
 Kernowek Standard
 Kerrier
 Kerrier (hundred)
 Kerrier local elections
 Keskerdh Kernow 500
 Kesva an Taves Kernewek
 Kiddlywink
 King Doniert's Stone
 King Edward Mine
 Kit Hill Country Park
 Kneehigh Theatre
 Knocker (folklore)
 Kowethas an Yeth Kernewek
 Kubb (band)
 Kynance Cove

L 

 Land's End
 Land's End Airport
 Languages of Cornwall
 Lanhydrock House
 Lanyon Quoit
 Lappa Valley Steam Railway
 Large Black (pig)
 Launceston (UK Parliament constituency)
 Launceston Castle
 Launceston F.C.
 Launceston RUFC
 Launceston, Cornwall
 Levant Mine & Beam Engine
 Lew Trenchard
 Liskeard
 Liskeard & Looe Union Canal
 Liskeard (UK Parliament constituency)
 Liskeard Athletic F.C.
 List of Cornish Christians
 List of Cornish artists, architects and craftspeople
 List of Cornish cheeses
 List of Cornish dialect words
 List of Cornish engineers and inventors
 List of Cornish flags
 List of Cornish geologists and explorers
 List of Cornish historians
 List of Cornish musicians
 List of Cornish philanthropists
 List of Cornish saints
 List of Cornish scientists and inventors
 List of Cornish soldiers, commanders and sailors
 List of Cornish sportsmen and sportswomen
 List of Cornish writers
 List of parliamentary constituencies in Cornwall
 List of Sites of Special Scientific Interest in Cornwall
 List of Special Areas of Conservation in Cornwall
 List of adjectival and demonymic forms of place names
 List of civil parishes in Cornwall
 List of farms in Cornwall
 List of foreign-language names for Cornwall
 List of former administrative divisions in Cornwall
 List of islands of Cornwall
 List of islands in the Isles of Scilly
 List of legendary rulers of Cornwall
 List of museums in Cornwall
 List of notable residents of Cornwall
 List of people from Cornwall
 List of places in Cornwall
 List of places in Penwith
 List of public art in Cornwall
 List of railway stations in Cornwall
 List of residents of Penzance
 List of schools in Cornwall
 List of shipwrecks of Cornwall
 List of shipwrecks of Cornwall (19th century)
 List of shipwrecks of Cornwall (20th century)
 List of shipwrecks of the Isles of Scilly
 List of topics related to Cornwall
 List of windmills in Cornwall
 Literature in Cornish
 Lizard Lighthouse
 Lizard Point, Cornwall
 Loe Pool
 Longships, Cornwall
 Looe
 Looe Valley Line
 Lord Lieutenant of Cornwall
 Lost Gardens of Heligan
 Lostwithiel
 Lostwithiel (UK Parliament constituency)
 Lostwithiel Stannary Palace
 Lostwithiel and Fowey Railway
 Luke Vibert

M 

 Maenporth
 Mainland
 Maps of Cornwall
 Marazion
 Maritime Line
 Mark Prisk
 Matthew Taylor (Liberal politician)
 Mawgan Porth
 Meadery
 Mebyon Kernow
 Media in Cornwall
 Mermaid of Zennor
 Mevagissey
 Michael An Gof
 Millbrook A.F.C.
 Minack Theatre
 Mining in Cornwall
 Mining in Cornwall and Devon
 Mitchell (UK Parliament constituency)
 Modern Celts
 Modern Cornish
 Mount Edgcumbe Country Park
 Mount Wellington Tin Mine
 Mount's Bay
 Mounts Bay RFC
 Mullion Cove
 Museum of Submarine Telegraphy, Cornwall
 Music of Cornwall
 Mylor Bridge
 Mên-an-Tol

N 

 National Association of Mining History Organisations
 Newlyn riots
 Newport (Cornwall) (UK Parliament constituency)
 Newquay
 Newquay A.F.C.
 Newquay Airport
 Newquay and Cornwall Junction Railway
 Nicholas Boson
 Nicholas Williams
 Nickanan Night
 North Cornwall
 North Cornwall (UK Parliament constituency)
 North Cornwall local elections
 Northern Europe
 Northern Hemisphere

O 

 Oggy Oggy Oggy
 Old Cornish units of measurement
 Owlman

P 

 POW Camp 115, Whitecross, St. Columb Major
 Padstow
 Padstow Coastal Gun Battery
 Pan-Celticism
 Par Canal
 Par Coastal Gun Battery
 Par Docks
 Parliamentary representation from Cornwall
 Parnall's Canal
 Pasty
 Pencarrow
 Pendeen Lighthouse
 Pendennis Castle
 Penhallam
 Penjerrick Garden
 Penlee House, Penzance, Cornwall
 Penlee Lifeboat Station
 Penlee lifeboat disaster
 Penna (surname)
 Penryn (UK Parliament constituency)
 Penryn Athletic F.C.
 Penryn and Falmouth (UK Parliament constituency)
 Penryn, Cornwall
 Penwith
 Penwith (hundred)
 2004 Penwith Council election
 2007 Penwith Council election
 Penwith Peninsula
 Penwith local elections
 Penzance
 Penzance A.F.C.
 Penzance Heliport
 Perkin Warbeck
 Perranporth
 Perranporth Airfield
 Peter and the Piskies: Cornish Folk and Fairy Tales
 Picrous Day
 Pixie (folklore)
 Places of interest in Cornwall
 Poldhu
 Politics of Cornwall
 Polperro
 Polzeath
 Porthcothan
 Porthcurno
 Porthleven
 Porthleven F.C.
 Porthtowan
 Portreath
 Praa Sands
 Prayer Book Rebellion
 Predannack Airfield

Q 

 Quay Sailing Club

R 

 RAF Davidstow Moor
 RAF St Eval
 RAF St Mawgan
 Raid on Mount's Bay
 RNAS Culdrose (HMS Seahawk)
 RRH Portreath
 Rame Peninsula
 Rebecca (1940 film)
 Rebecca (novel)
 Red-billed chough
 Redruth
 Redruth R.F.C.
 Restormel
 Restormel Castle
 2003 Restormel Council election
 Restormel local elections
 Revived Cornish Stannary Parliament
 Richard Gendall
 River Camel
 River Fal
 River Fowey
 River Gannel
 River Looe
 River Lynher
 River Tamar
 River Truro
 Robert Morton Nance
 Robert, Count of Mortain
 Rock, Cornwall
 Rod Lyon
 Roman Catholic Diocese of Plymouth
 Roseland Peninsula
 Round Island Light, Isles of Scilly
 Royal Albert Bridge
 Royal Cornwall Hospital
 Royal Cornwall Museum
 Royal Cornwall Polytechnic Society
 Royal Cornwall Show
 Royal Fowey Yacht Club
 Royal Geological Society of Cornwall
 Royal Institution of Cornwall
 Royal charters applying to Cornwall
 Royal duchy
 Rugby union in Cornwall

S 

 Saffron bun
 Saint Piran's Flag
 Saltash
 Saltash (UK Parliament constituency)
 Saltash United F.C.
 Sancreed
 School of Metalliferous Mining
 Scillonian (disambiguation)
 Scorrier
 Seaton Valley Countryside Park
 Second Cornish Uprising of 1497
 Sennen
 Shadow Minister for Cornwall
 Sharp's Brewery
 Sikorsky S-61 disaster 1983
 Skinner's Brewery
 Somerset and Cornwall Light Infantry
 South Crofty
 South East Cornwall (UK Parliament constituency)
 South West Coast Path
 South West England (European Parliament constituency)
 South West Regional Assembly
 South West of England Regional Development Agency
 Spirit of Mystery
 Sport in Cornwall
 St Austell
 St Austell (UK Parliament constituency)
 St Austell Brewery
 St Austell River
 St Austell and Newquay (UK Parliament constituency)
 St Breock Downs Monolith
 St Catherine's Castle
 St Columb Major
 St German's Priory
 St Germans (UK Parliament constituency)
 St Ives (UK Parliament constituency)
 St Ives Bay Line
 St Ives, Cornwall
 St Just in Penwith
 St Mabyn
 St Mawes
 St Mawes (UK Parliament constituency)
 St Mawes Castle
 St Michael's Hospital, Hayle
 St Michael's Mount
 St Piran's Day
 St Anthony's Lighthouse
 St Columb Canal
 St Mary's Airport, Isles of Scilly
 Stannary law
 Stannary town
 Stargazy pie
 Stateless nation
 Straw Dogs (1971 film)
 Surfers Against Sewage

T 

 Tamar Bridge
 Tamar Valley Line
 Tate St Ives
 Tater Du Lighthouse
 Tehidy Country Park
 The Camomile Lawn
 The Duke of Cornwall's Light Infantry
 The Gear Rout
 The Guild of Cornish Hedgers
The Gwineas
 The Hurlers (stone circles)
 The Lizard
 The Miners Association
 The Onyx
 The Pirates of Penzance
 The Poldark Novels
 The Song of the Western Men
 The Towans
 Thirteen Senses
 Thomas Flamank
 Timeline of Cornish history
 Tintagel
 Tintagel (Bax)
 Tintagel Castle
 Tom Bawcock's Eve
 Torpoint
 Torpoint Athletic F.C.
 Torpoint Ferry
 Torrey Canyon
 Torrey Canyon oil spill
 Transport in Cornwall
 Trebah
 Treffry
 Treffry Viaduct
 Tregiffian Burial Chamber
 Tregony (UK Parliament constituency)
 Tregothnan
 Trelawny Pitbulls
 Trelawny Tigers
 Trelissick Garden
 Trematon Castle
 Tremough
 Trengwainton Garden
 Trerice
 Tresco Heliport
 Trethevy Quoit
 Trevose Head Lighthouse
 Trewoon
 Triggshire
 Truro
 Truro (UK Parliament constituency)
 Truro Aerodrome
 Truro Cathedral
 Truro City F.C.
 Truro and Falmouth (UK Parliament constituency)
 Truro and Newquay Railway
 Truro and St Austell (UK Parliament constituency)
 1987 Truro by-election
 Truronian

U 

 Unified Cornish
 Unitary authorities of England
 United Kingdom
 University of Exeter, Cornwall Campus

V 

 Vanessa Beeman
 Vice-Admiral of Cornwall

W 

 Wadebridge
 Wadebridge Camels
 Wadebridge Town F.C.
 West Cornwall (UK Parliament constituency)
 West Cornwall Hospital
 West Cornwall May Day celebrations
 West Cornwall Railway
 West Cornwall Steam Ship Company
 West Looe (UK Parliament constituency)
 Western Europe
 Western Greyhound
 Wheal Jane
 Whitsand Bay
 Widemouth Bay
 Wild West (sitcom)
 Wolf Rock, Cornwall
 Woodbury Common, Devon
 Wycliffe

See also 

 Outline of the United Kingdom
 Outline of England
 Outline of Cornwall